Russia participated in the Junior Eurovision Song Contest 2021 which took place on 19 December 2021, in Paris, France. The Russian broadcaster All-Russia State Television and Radio Broadcasting Company (VGTRK) was responsible for organising their entry for the contest.  this was Russia's final entry at the contest, before the country was expelled from the EBU the following year.

Background 

In the  contest, Russia was represented by the song "My New Day" performed by Sofia Feskova. The song placed 10th in a field of 12 countries with 88 points.

Before Junior Eurovision

Akademiya Eurovision 2021 
The Russian broadcaster, VGTRK, announced on 20 January 2021 that they would be participating at the 2021 contest, taking place in Paris, France, on 19 December 2021. The national selection took place on 30 October 2021. Submissions for entrants were open between 20 January to 20 September, with the audition stage taking place in the Russian capital, Moscow on 30 September 2021 and featured 69 entries selected from a record of 600 received submissions. VGTRK announced on 14 October 2021 that a total of twelve artists would be competing in the national final.

Final 
The national selection final to select the entrant for Russia took place on 26 October 2021, and was televised later on 30 October. The winner was determined by a voting split of 50% jury members and 50% internet voting, which opened on 20 October and closed on 25 October. Tanya Mezhentseva won the national final with the song "Mon Ami". She previously represented Russia in the Junior Eurovision Song Contest 2019 with Denberel Oorzhak and their song "A Time for Us". "Mon Ami" was composed by Alexander Broshovyan, and lyricised by Danu Boian, Dmitriy Korochin and Tanya Mezhentseva. The jury consisted of three adult members: Manizha (2021 Russian Eurovision entrant), Yulia Savicheva (2004 Russian Eurovision entrant) and Ekaterina Orlova (Head of Delegation for Russia at the Junior Eurovision Song Contest), and two kids members: Ekaterina Maneshina and Valery Kuzakov.

At Junior Eurovision
After the opening ceremony, which took place on 13 December 2021, it was announced that Russia would perform seventh on 19 December 2021, following Bulgaria and preceding Ireland.

At the end of the contest, Russia received 124 points, placing 7th out of 19 participating countries.

Voting

Detailed voting results

Notes

References 

2021
Russia
Junior Eurovision Song Contest